Chuma Mmeka  also known as 'T-char'  is a award-winning poet and Nollywood star actor. He is a book cover designer and author of several books. He is a motivational writer, trainer, human capacity developer, corporate administrator, media personality and humanitarian working primarily in the area of child support and protection.

Career

Chuma Mmeka has been referred to as "a most unique Nigerian, an extraordinarily unique skills-box; a jack of many trades and a master of all" He convened 77 young writers and movie actors at Owerri, Imo State in October 2015, to effectively campaign against broken marriages among Nigerian celebrities. He is the Initiator of 'The Safe Child Project' through which he commenced from 2009, the quarterly support of 1000 Imo orphans. He organized in 2002, the first ever Miss Imo Beauty Pageant Contest in which the winner Miss Chidinma Dike took home a new car and other mouth-watering prizes. He coordinates programs that provide practical empowerment to targeted youths in Africa. Chuma Mmeka's Job Secrets Book Series reportedly sharpens the skills of enterprising Africans and empowers them with a practical insight into several professional areas like corporate fund raising and acting.

Mmeka is one of a new breed of modern day poets brought to the limelight through the publication of various anthologies of poetry around the world. His poems portray the oppression of women and show the influence of feminism in poetry, they promote African cultural traditions, and are collected internationally for academic purposes. He is a contributor to the Colgate University Council sponsored Dove Tales, An International Journal of the Arts to promote global peace, family and cultural identity His collections of true-life poetry "The Broken Home" and "Echoes of the Mind" have received global media and literary industry reviews
  Chuma has been described as an inspiring new-generation Nigerian poet, who had been writing since he was eight. His poems are listed in "Best New African Poets 2015 and 2016 Anthologies". He won the Maryam Babangida Children’s Poetry Prize in Nigeria at the age of 13 and the Emerging African Poet toga in 2017  He was awarded Best Upcoming Nollywood Actor (2019) by the Actors Guild of Nigeria. He has also won numerous awards for his humanitarian services across the world.

Listed as a Nigerian celebrity, Chuma Mmeka has starred in several Nigerian movies like Beyond Beauty, The King Must Marry A Strange Virgin, The 3 Idiots, The Arrogant Sisters, I Chose A Dirty Palace Maid, Broken Smile, Our Village Priest,. The Village Girl, The Crippled Maid and My Gateman Stole My Heart On Saturday.

He is also known for his roles in Nollywood feature films like the Samgold produced King Akubueze (2014) directed by Nonso Emekaekwue, featuring Clem Ohameze, Joyce Kalu, Rachael Okonkwo and Mike Godson; Ghetto Republic (2014) featuring Francis Duru and produced by Pressing Forward; Men In August Meeting (2014) directed by Evans Orji and featuring Dede One Day; Beyond Beauty (2015) featuring Chacha Eke and Victor Osuagwu directed by Andy Chukwu for Andybest Production; Secret Palace Mission (2014) a Richrock Production featuring Olu Jacobs and Chacha Eke Faani; Royal Assassins (2015) directed by Sylvester Madu; Equalizer 3000 (2016) directed by Austin Faani, featuring Harry B Anyanwu, Chelsea Eze, Emeka Enyiocha and Walter Anga; My State Governor (2016) directed by Goodnews Erico; Hanging Coffin (2016) directed by Kalu Anya; Family Ambition (2016) directed by Sylvester Madu and featuring Freddie Leonard; Tony Montana (2017) featuring Zubby Michael and directed by Emeka Jonathan Hills); Deadly Gang (2017) directed by Chidox and featuring Junior Pope; Return of the Book of Evil (2017) by Pressing Forward Production; Millionaire Sisters (2018) featuring Regina Daniels; Tears of My Destiny (2018) featuring Pete Edochie and directed by Emeka Titus; One More Bullet (2019) featuring Sam Dede and directed by Collins Okoro Boko; Ndaa Letti (2017), Uwadiegwu (2017), The Evil Man (2018) and Royal Twist (2018) all by Divine Touch Production; and many more.

Books
The Broken Home 2015 
Echoes of the Mind 2015 
The Fundraiser's Handbook 
A Successful Acting Career Guide 
My Colouring Activity Book 2 
My Colouring Activity Book 3

Personal life
Born on 21 June 1975 to Enyi Jim I. Mmeka and Lolo Jossy C. Mmeka of Alaenyi-Ofeahia, Amaigbo in Nwangele Local Government Area of Imo State in Nigeria's south east region. Chuma is married to Nikky Mmeka with children. He lost and buried his mother in May 2018 and father in January 2019.

Chuma Mmeka became a victim of child abuse with his parents' separation in 1976. Brought up under his mother, he suffered humiliation at different times in the hands of abusive maternal relatives. Being the first son of a polygamy, he was further branded a prodigal by some members of his paternal family for preferring to be with his mother. His formative life no doubt, is reflected in his writing style and social approach.

References

Nigerian humanitarians
1975 births
Nigerian poets
Living people
Nigerian male film actors
Igbo male actors
21st-century Nigerian male actors
Nigerian male writers
Nigerian media personalities
Nigerian philanthropists
Nigerian male poets